Ngarabal language may refer to:
the Copmanhurst dialect of the Bandjalang language, sometimes called Ngarabal
Ngarrbal or Ngarrabul, a dialect of the Yugambal language spoken by the Ngarabal people